Peace Adzo Medie is a Liberian-born Ghanaian academic and writer of both fiction and nonfiction.

Early life and education 
Medie was born in Liberia and moved to Ghana as a child, where she studied at OLA Girls Senior High School. She received a bachelor's degree in geography from the University of Ghana. She then completed her postgraduate studies in the United States, where she obtained a Ph.D. in public and international affairs from the University of Pittsburgh.

Career

Academic career 
Medie worked as a research fellow at the University of Ghana and a postdoctoral research fellow at Princeton University's Woodrow Wilson School of Public and International Affairs. She is now a senior lecturer in gender and international politics at the University of Bristol in the United Kingdom. Her work was awarded the 2012–2013 African Affairs African Author Prize.

Her scholarship focuses on gender, politics, and armed conflict.

In 2020, Medie published her first book, the scholarly work Global Norms and Location Action: The Campaigns to End Violence Against Women in Africa. It deals with post-conflict states' responses to violence against women.

She is on the editorial board of the journal Politics & Gender and co-edits the journal African Affairs.

Fiction writing 
In addition to her academic work, Medie has produced several works of short fiction. In 2020, she published her debut novel, His Only Wife. It deals with the struggles of modern marriage in Ghana and the interconnecting lives of three women, Afi, Evelyn, and Muna.  It was described as "A Cinderella story set in Ghana" by Kirkus.

His Only Wife was well received, appearing on several lists of best new releases, including the New York Times' Staff Picks. In 2021, she was named "Best Author" by the Ghanaian news station Citi TV at its annual Entertainment Achievement Awards.

Medie describes her fiction as being heavily influenced by her academic research into gender, violence, and politics.

Selected works 

  (non-fiction)
  (fiction)

References 

Ghanaian women academics
Ghanaian women novelists
Ghanaian women writers
Liberian women writers
Living people
OLA Girls Senior High School (Ho) alumni
University of Ghana alumni
University of Pittsburgh alumni
Year of birth missing (living people)